= Church of Hakeem =

New Religion of Christian Inspiration

- Orientation: Christianity
- Minister: Hakeem Abdul Rasheed
- Region: California, United States
- Origin: 1977

The Church of Hakeem is a new religion of Christian inspiration, based in California, that was founded by the preacher Hakeem Abdul Rasheed. His doctrine states that the money earned comes from God as a result of a religious spiritual awakening. Its practice consists in delivering, within 70 to 90 days, donations increased up to 400% percent. In the congregations, the pastor Hakeem exhorted the faithful to stop having doubts and negative thoughts. The leaders of the church committed the crime of diverting the funds, and were judged by the American justice system. Members and contributors recovered the funds. The founder was charged with fraud charges by mail to request more funds. He was also sentenced to five days in prison, for failing to comply with the order to give the information requested. This decision was paralyzed on the basis of the right to privacy and the right of association.
